Alexander Ivanovich Vakhrameyev (March 11, 1874 – March 16, 1926) was a painter who operated in the Russian Empire and Soviet Union.

Biography
Alexander Vakhrameyev was born in Vologda Governorate. His father was a churchman.

Gallery

Bibliography
 Каталог выставки картин Общества им. А. И. Куинджи в залах Общества поощрения художеств. Л.: 1927. 
 Рощин А. И. Александр Иванович Вахрамеев. М., 1971;
 Рылов А. Воспоминания. Л., 1977.
 Художники народов СССР. Биобиблиографический словарь. Т.2. М.: Искусство, 1972. С. 211.
 Живопись первой половины XX века (А-В) / Государственный Русский музей. СПб.: Palace Editions, 1997.
 Красноборский район Архангельской области. Энциклопедический словарь / Сост. Р. В. Власов. Колас, Архангельская обл., 2009. С. 43. .

References

1874 births
1926 deaths
People from Arkhangelsk Oblast
People from Solvychegodsky Uyezd
Soviet painters
Painters from the Russian Empire